The News of Orange County is a weekly newspaper based in Hillsborough, North Carolina covering northern Orange County, North Carolina. Started in 1893, the newspaper is owned by Womack Publishing Company of Chatham, Virginia. In 2018, the circulation was 4,200. Charlotte Wray is the publisher.

The newspaper focuses on community news, with an emphasis on local business, Orange County government, and local school coverage. The newspaper also features commentary from elected officials, a "Word on the Street" calendar, local church announcements, and police reports from the Hillsborough Police Department and the Orange County Sheriff's Office.

References

External links

Weekly newspapers published in North Carolina
Companies based in Hillsborough, North Carolina
Orange County, North Carolina
Newspapers established in 1893
1893 establishments in North Carolina